Au am Leithaberge is a town in the district of Bruck an der Leitha in Lower Austria in Austria.

Geography
Au am Leithaberge lies in the industrial area of Lower Austria on the western edge of the Leitha mountains. About 35.81 percent of the municipality is forested.

References

Cities and towns in Bruck an der Leitha District